The women's 100 metres hurdles at the 2012 European Athletics Championships was held at the Helsinki Olympic Stadium on 29 and 30 June.

Medalists

Records

Schedule

Results

Round 1
First 3 in each heat (Q) and 4 best performers (q) advance to the Semifinals.

Wind:Heat 1: +0.3 m/s, Heat 2: −0.1 m/s, Heat 3: −0.8 m/s, Heat 4: −0.4 m/s

Semifinals
First 3 in each heat (Q) and 2 best performers (q) advance to the Final.

Wind:Heat 1: -2.3 m/s, Heat 2: +0.6 m/s

Final
Wind: -1.4 m/s

References
 Round 1 Results
 Semifinal Results
 Final Results
Full results

Hurdles 100 W
Sprint hurdles at the European Athletics Championships
2012 in women's athletics